Coggeshall Hamlet is a hamlet in the civil parish of Coggeshall and the Braintree District of Essex, England. The hamlet is less than 1 mile south from the small market town of Coggeshall, and is on the B1024 road south from the A120. The River Blackwater flows at the east of the hamlet.

References 
 A-Z Essex (page 25)

Hamlets in Essex
Coggeshall